This article lists events from the year 2021 in The Bahamas.

Incumbents 

 Monarch: Elizabeth II
 Governor-General: Cornelius A. Smith
 Prime Minister: Philip Davis

Events 
1 January – New Year Honours
Dr. Merceline Dahl-Regis is awarded the Most Distinguished Order of Saint Michael and Saint George for services to Public and Community health.
10 March – Authorities worry about an increase in migrants from Haiti and Cuba. The skipper of a raft from Cuba is arrested for human trafficking after his raft explodes, leaving one dead and five missing (including a 28-year-old woman and her two children, 4 and 6). Twenty others were rescued; three of the rescuers had to be treated in a Bahamian hospital for sunburn.

Deaths
17 March – Ed Armbrister, 72, baseball player (Cincinnati Reds); complications from diabetes.

See also
List of years in the Bahamas
2021 in the Caribbean
COVID-19 pandemic in the Bahamas
2021 Atlantic hurricane season

References

External links
U.S. must better engage Bahamas, where our competitor, China, is making major investments (Opinion, The Miami Herald, January 7, 2021)

 
2020s in the Bahamas
Years of the 21st century in the Bahamas
Bahamas
Bahamas